Raheem Shaquille Rushan Hanley (born 24 February 1994) is professional footballer who plays as a left-back for Stalybridge Celtic. Born in England, he has represented Saint Kitts and Nevis internationally.

Hanley is an attacking left-back. He is also able to play in central midfield.

Club career

Youth football
Hanley began his career at Fletcher Moss Rangers. He then moved onto Manchester United in 2004.

Blackburn Rovers/Swansea City
Hanley joined Blackburn Rovers from Manchester United following a successful trial in 2010. He initially struggled with injuries, before he played regular under-21 football in the centre of midfield during the 2011–12 season as the Academy reached the final of the FA Youth Cup and the Academy League National Final. At the end of the 2012–13 season, he was offered a new contract by the club, without making a single first team appearance.

He joined Swansea City in January 2014. He signed a new one-year contract with the "Swans" in April 2015. At the end of the 2015–16 season, Hanley was released by the club, without making a single first team appearance.

Northampton Town
He signed a two-year contract with Northampton Town in June 2016. Hanley said that manager Rob Page convinced him that Northampton was the best place for him to advance his career, and promised to challenge David Buchanan for a first-team place.

Hanley made his senior debut for the "Cobblers" after coming on as a 57th minute substitute for JJ Hooper in a 3–0 defeat to Wycombe Wanderers on 30 August 2016, in an EFL Trophy group stage match at Sixfields Stadium. However, Hanley spent the most of the season on the sideline, making 5 appearances in all competitions, as he was surplus to requirements at Northampton Town in his first season. At the end of the 2016–17 season, he was among four players to be placed on a transfer list.

Ahead of the 2017–18 season, Hanley went on a trial with Oxford United and featured in a trial match. Although the move never happened, Hanley remained at the club and continued to remain surplus to requirements, though he appeared in the first team on four occasions. On 10 March 2018, Hanley was loaned out to Halifax Town for the rest of the season. He made his FC Halifax Town debut on 10 March 2018, in a 3–1 win over Woking. He went on to make 7 appearances for FC Halifax Town.

He was released by Northampton at the end of the 2017–18 season, following their relegation.

Chorley
After a little over one month at Connah's Quay Nomads,

Radcliffe
In January 2020 he joined Radcliffe.

Stalybridge Celtic 
In October 2022 he joined Stalybridge Celtic.

International career
Hanley previously represented England U19, being called up for the first time in October 2012. He went on to earn 3 caps.

Hanley's grandfather was from Saint Kitts and Nevis. In November 2018, he was called up to Saint Kitts and Nevis national football team and made his debut on 18 November 2018 in a CONCACAF Nations League qualifier against Canada, as a starter.

Career Statistics

Personal life
In November 2015, Hanley was banned from driving for 14 months after being caught speeding by the police.

References

External links
England profile at The Football Association

1994 births
Living people
Citizens of Saint Kitts and Nevis through descent
Saint Kitts and Nevis footballers
Association football fullbacks
Association football midfielders
Saint Kitts and Nevis international footballers
Footballers from Blackburn
English footballers
Fletcher Moss Rangers F.C. players
Manchester United F.C. players
Blackburn Rovers F.C. players
Swansea City A.F.C. players
Northampton Town F.C. players
Connah's Quay Nomads F.C. players
Chorley F.C. players
Mossley A.F.C. players
Radcliffe F.C. players
English Football League players
England youth international footballers
Black British sportspeople
English sportspeople of Saint Kitts and Nevis descent
Northern Premier League players
FC Halifax Town players